Comitas latescens is an extinct species of sea snails, a marine gastropod mollusc in the family Pseudomelatomidae, the turrids and allies

Description
The length of the shell attains 21.5 mm, its diameter 10.1 mm.

(Original description) The fusiform shell has an acute spire. The rounded whorls are closely spirally striated. The spire whorls are obliquely plicated. There is a deep, broad groove at the suture. The aperture is ovate. The siphonal canal is rather produced. The body whorl is shorter than the spire.

Distribution
This extinct  marine species is endemic to New Zealand and was found off Mount Brown

References

 Maxwell, P.A. (2009). Cenozoic Mollusca. pp 232–254 in Gordon, D.P. (ed.) New Zealand inventory of biodiversity. Volume one. Kingdom Animalia: Radiata, Lophotrochozoa, Deuterostomia. Canterbury University Press, Christchurch.

latescens
Gastropods described in 1873
Gastropods of New Zealand